The Polish Garden is a 2.3–hectare garden and park complex in the Admiralteysky District of St. Petersburg, Russia. It is bounded by the Fontanka River embankment to the north and the Catholic Cathedral of the Assumption of the Blessed Virgin Mary to the south. The Garden was named after the Polish community of Saint Petersburg which attended the Cathedral in the 19th century.

The predecessor of the current park was a private palatial garden in the courtyard of the estate belonging to Gavrila Derzhavin on the Fontanka, which was probably remodelled under the supervision of Nikolay Lvov. In 2006, the property was acquired by the National Pushkin Museum and between 2007 and 2011 the park and the Derzhavin Palace were renovated.

The entry to the Polish Garden is free and the premises are often used for weddings, public gatherings and photoshoots.

Gallery

See also
Polish minority in Russia
Neva

References

Parks and open spaces in Saint Petersburg
Tourist attractions in Saint Petersburg
Squares in Saint Petersburg
Cultural heritage monuments of federal significance in Saint Petersburg